Gregorio Y. Narvasa II, also known as Ogie Narvasa, is a Filipino lawyer. He is the son of Andres Narvasa, a former Chief Justice of the Supreme Court of the Philippines, and Janina Yuseco. Aside from practicing law, Narvasa was the commissioner of the Philippine Basketball League, the country's top amateur league, and the professional Metropolitan Basketball Association.

See also
Andres Narvasa
Philippine Basketball League
Metropolitan Basketball Association

References

External links
LegalAdvantage.com.ph - Gregorio Y. Narvasa II

Year of birth missing (living people)
Living people
Filipino men's basketball players
Filipino men's basketball coaches
20th-century Filipino lawyers
Philippine Basketball League executives
Ateneo Blue Eagles men's basketball players
Metropolitan Basketball Association executives
University of the Philippines alumni
21st-century Filipino lawyers